Sonny Fredie-Pedersen is a Danish artist. He was born and raised in Copenhagen, Denmark.

Fredie-Pedersen has featured in several of his own national TV shows evolving around his life as an entertainer, such as, Ingen Slinger I Valsen, Familien Pedersen, and Sonny, Dans og Stjernedrømme. In 2020 Pedersen was a lead character as judge & captain, when he joined the BBC hit TV show The Greatest Dancer in the Danish production run. in 2022 it was announced he would join as a new judge on the Danish version of Dancing With The Stars "Vild Med Dans"

In 1998, Pedersen was the lead in the award-winning documentary, Ingen Slinger I Valsen. The documentary was awarded the Danish TV Oscar in 1999 and nominated for the International television award "Prix Italia".

In theater, Pedersen has brought to life notable characters such as 'Danny Zuko' in Grease - The Musical, 'Baby John' in West Side Story, 'Troy Bolton' in High School Musical - On Stage, 'Pilot Gregersen in Simon and 'Bjørn' in Gummi Tarzan - The Musical.

As a choreographer and dancer, Sonny Fredie-Pedersen is credited with having worked with Christina Aguilera, Nicki Minaj, Taylor Swift, Paula Abdul, Kylie Minogue, Will Smith, J Balvin, Nicky Jam, Kenny Ortega, Pamela Anderson and Nicole Scherzinger amongst others. Pedersen is a former competitive dancer and has sixteen Danish National Championship titles in Latin and Ballroom on his record. He has worked and performed on International TV productions, such as Dancing With The Stars, Americas Got Talent, The Oscars, Eurovision and The FIFA World Cup 2018

As a recording artist Sonny Fredie-Pedersen has released 5 albums since the year 2001. He has ranked in the Top 10 on the Danish Billboard numerous times and has released with labels Warner Music Group, Sony Music and Copenhagen Records. Since 2012 Pedersen has released music under his first name SONNY.

Fredie-Pedersen is a recipient of the Danish award "Vibeke Rørvig Legatet", which is presented to notable dancers, singers, stage designers and theater figures with ties to The Royal Danish Ballet. He was a recipient at the 25th anniversary award ceremony in 2011.

References

Living people
1986 births
Danish pop singers
Danish male actors
Danish choreographers
Danish emigrants to the United States